Jonas Sultan (born December 16, 1991) is a Filipino professional boxer. He is the current WBO Inter-continental bantamweight champion. He held the IBF Inter-continental junior bantamweight title since December 2016 by beating South Africa's Makazole Tete.

Professional career

Early career at super flyweight and bantamweight
Sultan made his professional debut against Glenn Campaner on 17 March 2013. He won his fight by unanimous decision, with scores of 40-36, 39-37 and 40-36. He amassed a 9-2 record during the next two years, with four record coming by way of stoppage. Sultan was scheduled to challenge Rene Dacquel for the Philippines Games & Amusement Board (GAB) bantamweight title on 11 July 2015. He won the fight by unanimous decision, with scores of 115-111, 114-112 and 117-109. Dacquel was deducted a point in the ninth round for a clash of heads which caused a cut above Sultan's right eyelid. Sultan next faced the #11 ranked IBF super-flyweight contender Go Onaga on 15 November 2015, at the City Gym in Tomigusuku, Japan, in his first fight outside of Philippines. Onaga won the fight by unanimous decision, with scores of 99-92, 98-93 and 97-94. Sultan faced Tatsuya Ikemizu on 27 March 2016, in his second fight in Japan. He won the fight by a second-round technical knockout. Sultan made the first defense of his GAB bantamweight title against Romel Oliveros on 28 May 2016. He won the fight by a fifth-round knockout, stopping Oliveros with a right straight.

Sultan challenged the reigning IBF Intercontinental super-flyweight titleholder Makazole Tete on 16 December 2016. The fight took place in the champion's native East London, South Africa, at the Mdantsane Indoor Centre. Despite coming into the fight as an underdog, Sultan won his first regional title by an upset second-round technical knockout.

Sultan vs. Jaro
Sultan made the first defense of his secondary title against the former WBC and The Ring flyweight champion Sonny Boy Jaro on 7 May 2017. He won the fight by an eight-round knockout, stopping Jaro with a flurry of punches at the 1:25 minute mark.

Sultan vs. Casimero
Sultan faced the former IBF junior-flyweight and flyweight champion John Riel Casimero in an IBF super-flyweight title eliminator bout on 16 September 2017, at the Waterfront Hotel and Casino in Cebu City, Philippines. He won the fight by unanimous decision, with scores of 117-111, 116-112 and 115-113.

Sultan vs. Ancajas
Sultan's victory against Casimero earned him the right to challenge the reigning IBF super-flyweight champion Jerwin Ancajas. The bout between the two was scheduled for 26 May 2018, and took place at the Savemart Center in Fresno, California. Ancajas won the fight by unanimous decision, with scores of 119-109, 117-111 and 119-109.

Sultan faced the one-time WBO flyweight title challenger Ardin Diale on 24 November 2018. He won the fight by unanimous decision, with scores of 98-92, 97-93 and 98-92. After successfully bouncing back from his loss to Ancajas, Sultan was scheduled to face Athenkosi Dumezweni for the vacant WBC Silver super-flyweight title on 28 April 2019. He lost the fight by a wide unanimous decision, with scores of 117-109, 119-108 and 119-109. Sultan was knocked down twice during the twelve round bout. Sultan faced Salatiel Amit on 17 August 2019, in his final fight at super-flyweight. He won the fight by a seventh-round technical knockout.

Return to bantamweight
Sultan moved up to bantamweight for his next bout, against Jose Maria Cardenas, on the undercard of the WBO bantamweight title bout between John Riel Casimero and Guillermo Rigondeaux. The bout was scheduled for 14 August 2021, following a two-year absence from the sport, and took place at the Dignity Health Sports Park in Carson, California. Cardenas later withdrew from the bout, and was replaced by Sharone Carter. Sultan won the fight by knockout, stopping Carter with a right straight at the 2:29 minute mark of the seventh round.

Sultan faced the undefeated Carlos Caraballo for the vacant WBO Intercontinental bantamweight title on 30 October 2021, at the Madison Square Garden in New York City. He won the action-packed bout by unanimous decision, with all three judges scoring the fight 94-93 in his favor. Sultan knocked Caraballo down four times, in the second, third, sixth and ninth rounds, and was himself knocked down once, in the third round.

Sultan vs. Butler
Sultan is scheduled to face Paul Butler for the vacant WBO interim bantamweight title on April 22, 2022. Sultan stepped in as a short notice replacement for the WBO bantamweight champion John Riel Casimero, who was not permitted to fight by the British Boxing Board of Control (BBBofC) due to medical guidelines violation. Sultan lost the fight by unanimous decision, with scores of 116–112, 117–111 and 117–111.

Professional boxing record

Titles in boxing 
Regional Titles:
GAB bantamweight title (118 lbs)
IBF Intercontinental super flyweight title (115 lbs)
WBO Intercontinental bantamweight title (118 lbs)

External links

References

1991 births
Super-flyweight boxers
Bantamweight boxers
Living people
Filipino male boxers
Sportspeople from Zamboanga del Norte